Major League Quadball (MLQ), formerly Major League Quidditch, is an amateur quidditch league based in the United States and Canada. The league is composed of 16 city-based teams—14 in the U.S. and 2 in Canada. The MLQ season runs from June to August, with each team playing twelve games in the regular season. The playoffs includes the top 12 teams competing in the MLQ Championship in late August, culminating in the championship series. The winning team is awarded the Benepe Cup.

History
Major League Quadball was founded in 2014 by Ethan Sturm, who joined with Amanda Dallas in hopes of elevating the sport of quidditch to higher levels of competition. Sturm and Dallas currently co-commission the league.

In December 2021, US Quadball (USQ) and Major League Quadball (MLQ) announced their intention to change their names to distance themselves from Harry Potter author J.K. Rowling's views on transgender people and WarnerBros' ownership of the Quidditch trademark. Following a poll of members, MLQ decided to change its name from "Major League Quiddich" to "Major League Quadball" in July 2022. The change was carried out jointly with US Quadball. The name refers to the number of balls used in the sport and the number of positions held in the field and was to be adopted following the conclusion of the 2022 MLQ championship.

Structure

Current league structure
In 2019, MLQ reorganized the league into 3 divisions with 5 franchises in each division. As part of this reorganization, three changes happened: (1) all franchises in the West Division were disbanded due to long inter-divisional travel times, (2) three new teams were added to the remaining Divisions (the Minneapolis Monarchs and the Toronto Raiders joined the North Division, while the San Antonio Soldados joined the South Division), and (3) Rochester Whiteout moved from the North Division to the East Division. Charlotte was added as an expansion franchise in 2021 due to Ottawa and Toronto's inability to cross the border due to the COVID-19 pandemic restrictions. In this season, Charlotte took Ottawa's spot in the East and the North division only competed with 4 teams.  In 2022, with Toronto and Ottawa's return, Rochester Whiteout returned to the North the division they had left upon the addition of Toronto and Minneapolis and Ottawa rejoined the East.  

The North Division includes much of the geographic Midwest, including Toronto and Rochester. The six teams in the North Division are the Minneapolis Monarchs, Chicago Prowl (previously the Indianapolis Intensity), the Detroit Innovators, Cleveland Riff, the Rochester Whiteout, and the Toronto Raiders.  For the first six weeks of the season, the division is split in half, with Detroit, Minneapolis and Chicago playing each other and Cleveland, Rochester and Toronto playing each other. Each team will play a three-game home series and a three-game away series within their conference during those opening six weeks. This will give them a final standing within their conference. Then, all six teams travel to the North Division Championship. During that weekend, the North Divisional Champion is be crowned and the division’s four bids are handed out.

The East Division includes all MLQ teams in the geographic Northeast and Mid-Atlantic regions, plus Ottawa. The five teams in the East Division are Boston Forge, Charlotte Aviators, the New York Titans, the Washington Admirals, and the Ottawa Black Bears.

The South Division includes all teams in the geographic South Central region of the United States, plus Kansas City. The five teams in the South Division are the Austin Outlaws, the San Antonio Soldados, the League City Legends, New Orleans Curse, and Kansas City Stampede.

Past league structures
The first season took place in 2015 with eight teams. MLQ had an extremely successful first season, picking up a partnership with SAVAGEultimate, Petersons Brooms and Destination Toledo, hosting 12 regular-season, three-game series, and the 2015 MLQ Championship in Toledo, Ohio.

In the 2016 season, MLQ doubled the size of the league to 16 teams and geographically expanded it with the creation of the South and West Division. The new teams were located in Austin, Kansas City, League City, New Orleans, Los Angeles, Phoenix, Salt Lake City, and San Francisco. The same sixteen teams competed in 2017.

In 2018, the Phoenix Sol relocated to Boise, Idaho as the Boise Grays. During the Boise Grays' first match of the 2018 season, a brawl broke out between the Grays and Salt Lake City Hive. MLQ immediately disbanded the Boise Grays for the remainder of the 2018 season as punishment for the brawl.

Organizational structure
MLQ is a nonprofit run entirely by volunteers. All central operations - such as people operations, accounting, marketing, and administration - operate remotely and there is no central headquarters for personnel. 

MLQ has over 100 volunteers across 8 departments. Departments include: Gameplay; Finance; People Operations; Marketing; Creative; Digital Media; Diversity Equity & Inclusion; and Events. At the top of the organization are Commissioners Amanda Dallas and Ethan Sturm. Each of the 8 departments has a Director who oversees operations and reports to the Commissioners. Directors' departmental teams are composed of managers, coordinators, and assistants.

Franchise staff (such as coaches, assistant coaches, managers and assistant managers) apply each season and are hired only for the duration of the MLQ season. Franchise staff select the rosters for their own teams.

Referees are hired on series by series basis.

Competition format

During the regular season, teams plays a three-game series against all other teams in their division throughout June and July. All three games are played in each series, regardless of the outcome of the first two games, though the team that wins at least 2 out of the 3 games wins the series. Teams are ranked as a result of these series' outcomes. The top four teams in each division are invited to the Championship in August. These twelve teams are re-sorted into pools and play in a bracketed series format working towards the final three-game series for the Benepe Cup. Started in 2018, teams sometimes play "SuperSeries", which involve three teams playing at one location over two days. SuperSeries were developed in an attempt to save costs for the players.

Teams

Inactive Teams

Expansion Teams

The West Division was eliminated at the end of the 2018 season due to extensive travel time for the teams. In addition to the 3-team expansion in 2019, the Rochester Whiteout were moved from the North Division to the East.

With the addition of Charlotte in 2021 (and their retention for 2022), and the return of Toronto and Ottawa for 2022 Rochester was moved back into the North Division.

^The Charlotte Aviators temporarily joined the East Division as an MLQ Trial Expansion Team* for the 2021 season and were invited to return in the same capacity in 2022.

League champions

Relations with Other Quidditch Governing Bodies
MLQ is an independent quidditch organization in North America dedicated to developing the highest possible level of competition in quidditch.

International Quidditch Association (IQA) 

Unlike most quidditch leagues, MLQ is not a member or partner of the International Quidditch Association (IQA).

US Quadball (USQ) 

MLQ occasionally partners with US Quadball to create resources and put on non-gameplay events that further the growth of the sport of quidditch in the U.S. or North America more generally. However, the two are separate and distinct organizations.

MLQ players typically begin playing quidditch on USQ teams, most often for a college or university. Many MLQ players also continue to play on USQ teams when MLQ is not in season, since USQ season runs from September through May.

Quidditch Canada (QC) 

MLQ occasionally partners with Quidditch Canada to create resources and put on non-gameplay events that further the growth of the sport of quidditch in Canada or North America more generally. 

Canada-based MLQ players typically begin playing quidditch QC teams, most often for a college or university. Many Canadian MLQ players also continue to play on QC teams when MLQ is not in season, since QC season runs from September through May.

See also

Quidditch Canada
US Quadball
International Quidditch Association
Quidditch in Canada 
Quidditch (sport)
Fictional Quidditch

References

External links
Major League Quadball official website

Quidditch competitions
Sports leagues established in 2015
2015 establishments in North America